The Petit Rocher station is a flag stop Via Rail station in the village of Petit Rocher, New Brunswick, Canada. Petit Rocher is served by Via Rail's Montreal–Halifax train, the Ocean.

External links

 Via Rail page for the Ocean

Via Rail stations in New Brunswick
Buildings and structures in Gloucester County, New Brunswick
Transport in Gloucester County, New Brunswick